Hans Christian Joachim Gram (13 September 1853 – 14 November 1938) was a Danish bacteriologist noted for his development of the Gram stain, still a standard technique to classify bacteria and make them more visible under a microscope.

Early life and education
Gram was the son of Frederik Terkel Julius Gram, a professor of jurisprudence, and Louise Christiane Roulund.

He studied at the University of Copenhagen, and was an assistant for botany to the zoologist Japetus Steenstrup. His study of plants introduced him to the basics of pharmacology and the use of the microscope.

Gram began medical school in 1878 and graduated in 1883. He travelled throughout Europe between 1878 and 1885.

Career

Gram stain

In Berlin, in 1884, Gram developed a method for distinguishing between two major classes of bacteria. This technique, known as Gram staining, continues to be a standard procedure of medical microbiology. This work gained Gram an international reputation. The staining method later played a major role in classifying bacteria. Gram was a modest man, and in his initial publication he remarked, "I have therefore published the method, although I am aware that as yet it is very defective and imperfect; but it is hoped that also in the hands of other investigators it will turn out to be useful."

A Gram stain is made using a primary stain of crystal violet and a counterstain of safranin. Bacteria that turn purple when stained are termed 'Gram-positive', while those that turn red when counterstained are termed 'Gram-negative'.

Other work
Gram's initial work concerned the study of human red blood cells. He was among the first to recognise that macrocytes were characteristic of pernicious anaemia.

During 1891, Gram taught pharmacology, and later that year was appointed professor at the University of Copenhagen. In 1900, he resigned his professorship of pharmacology to become professor of medicine. As a professor, he published four volumes of clinical lectures which became used widely in Denmark. He retired from the University of Copenhagen in 1923, and died in 1938.

Popular recognition
On 13 September 2019, Google commemorated the anniversary of his birth with a Doodle for Canada, Peru, Argentina, Australia, New Zealand, Israel, India and some European countries.

Personal life 
Gram's great-granddaughter Lone Gram is a microbiologist who works at the Technical University of Denmark.

References

External links

 

1853 births
1938 deaths
Danish bacteriologists
Danish microbiologists